Mirosław Antoni Pawlak (born 2 April 1942 in Zielonki, Jędrzejów County) is a Polish politician. He was elected to the Sejm on 25 September 2005, getting 6684 votes in 33 Kielce district as a candidate from the Polish People's Party list.

He was also a member of Sejm 1993-1997, Sejm 1997-2001, and Sejm 2001-2005.

See also
Members of Polish Sejm 2005-2007

External links
Mirosław Pawlak - parliamentary page - includes declarations of interest, voting record, and transcripts of speeches.

Members of the Polish Sejm 2005–2007
Members of the Polish Sejm 1993–1997
Members of the Polish Sejm 1997–2001
Members of the Polish Sejm 2001–2005
Polish People's Party politicians
1942 births
Living people
Members of the Polish Sejm 2007–2011
Members of the Polish Sejm 2011–2015